James Brand may refer to:

James T. Brand (1886–1964), judge in Oregon
James Brand (musician) (1976–2010), American musician
James Brand (merchant) (1822–1897), Scottish-American merchant
James Brande, MP for Old Sarum